AMH may refer to:

Geography 
Academia Mexicana de la Historia, the national academy of history, in Mexico
Alaska Marine Highway, ferry services along the southern coast of Alaska and to Washington state
AMH, IATA airport code for Arba Minch Airport, Ethiopia
Jefferson Abington Hospital (formerly known as Abington Memorial Hospital), a hospital in Pennsylvania, United States

Medicine 
Anti-Müllerian hormone, a protein that affects sexual development of human male embryos
Atlantic Modal Haplotype, a genetic Y-chromosome haplotype
Australian Medicines Handbook, a medical reference text used by health professionals in Australia
Atypical melanocytic hyperplasia

General usage 
AMH, common college or university course code prefix for American history
amh, SIL and ISO 639-2 code for the Amharic language
amh, a Latin-script trigraph used in Irish orthography
AMH, US Navy occupational rating code for Aviation structural mechanic (Hydraulics)
Anatomically modern humans, the sub-species Homo sapiens sapiens
Anthony Michael Hall, an American actor running production company AMH Entertainment